Deserticossus danilevskyi is a moth in the family Cossidae. It is found in Kazakhstan.

The length of the forewings is 17–22 mm. The forewings are grey, with a row of dark strokes along the costal margin and a dark band in the submarginal area. The hindwings are dark, but light at the base and along the anal margin.

References

Natural History Museum Lepidoptera generic names catalog

Cossinae
Moths described in 2006
Moths of Asia